Frank R. McKelvy (January 24, 1914 – February 18, 1980) was an American set decorator. He was nominated for seven Academy Awards in the category Best Art Direction. He worked on nearly 70 different films and TV shows from 1947 to 1979.

Selected filmography
McKelvy was nominated for seven Academy Awards for Best Art Direction:
 The Hindenburg (1975)
 Earthquake (1974)
 They Shoot Horses, Don't They? (1969)
 The Pigeon That Took Rome (1962)
 North by Northwest (1959)
 Vertigo (1958)
 The Proud and Profane (1956)

References

External links

1914 births
1980 deaths
American set decorators
People from Pennsylvania